The Gregynog Press, also known as Gwasg Gregynog, is a printing press and charity located at Gregynog Hall near Newtown in Powys, Wales.

Early years
Founded in 1922 by the sisters and art patrons Margaret and Gwendoline Davies, guided by Thomas Jones, the press was named after their mansion Gregynog Hall. Jones remained its chairman throughout its existence. It rose to prominence in the pre-war era as among the more important private presses, publishing limited edition books, primarily on a Victoria platen printing press. Much of the printing work from 1927 to 1936 was carried out by the skilled printer Herbert John Hodgson, who had previously worked on the 1926 edition of the T. E. Lawrence's Seven Pillars of Wisdom. The American poet and printer Loyd Haberly was briefly the controller of the press.

It commissioned a private typeface from Graily Hewitt, Gwendolin, dated 1935. It was manufactured as a private commission by Monotype.

Reincarnation as Gwasg Gregynog
In 1954 after the death of Gwendoline Davies, Margaret donated most of the machinery used by Gregynog Press to the National Library of Wales. The press was reopened under the Welsh title Gwasg Gregynog by the University of Wales in 1978, and production resumed. While the National Library permanently loaned the Press its original Victoria platen press in 1980, since 1986 it has primarily printed with a Heidelberg Cylinder Press. Typesetting of the smallest pieces is done by hand, but otherwise manuscripts are typeset with the use of a Monotype machine. Among the publications of the press are a series of pamphlets entitled "Beirdd Gregynog / Gregynog Poets": the first of these was Euros Bowen's Yr Alarch, 1987.

Gwasg Gregynog Limited is a company limited by guarantee which was incorporated on 28 June 1978. It adopted new Memorandum and Articles of Association on 28 August 2001 and was granted charitable status by the Charity Commission on 11 January 2002 (charity no. 1090060). Intended to benefit and educate the public, it offers lectures related to the press and printing techniques, as well as offering tours of press facilities, which are dedicated to maintaining traditional printing methods.

The press has been involved in several historic events in Wales in connection with the National Assembly. When the Assembly opened in Wales, the press produced its first documents, including a small hand-bound souvenir volume that served as the Assembly's first publication. Later, in 2006, it bound a poem commissioned to mark the opening of the Senedd, the Assembly's permanent home, and written in calligraphy.

Notes

Further reading
Dowd, Anthony; Brockman, James (2004), The Special Bindings of Gwasg Gregynog. Newtown, Powys, Wales: Gwasg Gregynog. 
Esslemont, David; Hughes, Glyn Tegai (1990), Gwasg Gregynog: a descriptive catalogue of printing at Gregynog 1970-1990. Newtown, Powys, Wales: Gwasg Gregynog. 
Esslemont, David; Schanilec, Gaylord; Armacost, J. Andrew; Chambers, David (2003), Ink on the Elbow: conversations between David Esslemont & Gaylord Schanilec, Solmentes Press, 
 Evans, Jayne (1990), Gregynog Press Gwasg Gregynog
Haberly, Loyd (1979) An American Bookbuilder in England and Wales. London: Bertram Rota
 Hutchins, Michael (1976), Printing at Gregynog = Argraffu yng Ngregynog : aspects of a great private press = agweddau ar wasg breifat fawr; translated by David Jenkins = y cyfieithiad gan David Jenkins. Cardiff: Welsh Arts Council

External links

Publishing companies established in 1922
Arts in Wales
Book arts
Printing companies of the United Kingdom
Printmaking groups and organizations
Charities based in Wales
Book publishing companies of Wales
Companies based in Powys
British companies established in 1922
Private press movement